is a Japanese light novel series in two volumes by Pentabu based on a popular blog of the same name with 11 million page views. A manga adaptation by Rize Shinba started serialization in 2007 and was published by Enterbrain under their B's LOG Comic imprint. A movie adaption was published in 2009 with My Geeky Girlfriend as the International English title. Both the light novel and manga have been licensed for release by Yen Press.

Story synopsis 

The story is about the misadventures of a college student, who was falling in love with a pretty girl two years his senior, while in a part-time job, only to find out his girlfriend is a hard-core yaoi fangirl, and so his torment begins.

Media

Novels 

The novels contains blog entries of the blog with the same name from 2005 to 2007.

|}

Manga 

In December 2007, Enterbrain published the first volume of the manga adaptation created by Rize Shinba in its B’s LOG Comics imprint. The fourth volume was released in April 2009. The manga has been translated into Chinese, German, English and French; in Germany, it is published as Akihabara Shōjo.

|}

Film 

The live action film was released in Japan's theaters in May 2009. It was directed by Atsushi Kaneshige, with screenplay written by Ei Katsuragi.

References

External links 
 the official blog webpage of Fujoshi Kanojo at Pentabu 
 Fujoshi Kanojo manga official webpage 
 official webpage of the movie 
 
 My Girlfriend's a Geek novel series page at Yen Press
 My Girlfriend's a Geek manga series page at Yen Press

2006 Japanese novels
Internet memes
Japanese blogs
Light novels
Manga adapted into films
Technology blogs
Works about fandom
Yen Press titles
Kadokawa Dwango franchises
Japanese romantic comedy films